Müjde Yüksel (born 9 March 1981 in Kadıköy, İstanbul) is a former Turkish female basketball player. The 1.80 m (5' 11") national competitor played in the forward position.

After Yüksel played for Migrosspor, she transferred to Fenerbahçe İstanbul. She played for two seasons with Fenerbahçe and won one Turkish Women's Basketball League championship, two Turkey Cup and one President’s Cup title. Yüksel signed a contract with Beşiktaş J.K. for the  2005-06 season, then transferred to Mersin BŞB for the 2006-07 season.

Yüksel played in the national team, which participated in the 2005 Mediterranean Games in Almería, Spain where she won a gold medal.

Upon earning her PhD from the Isenberg School of Management at the University of Massachusetts Amherst, Yuksel joined the Sawyer Business School at Suffolk University in August 2014 as an assistant professor of Marketing.

In October 2015 Müjde married Clint Palermo in Harvard, Massachusetts. In November 2017 they had a baby.

See also
 Turkish women in sports

External links
 Player profile at eurobasket.net
 

1981 births
Living people
People from Kadıköy
Turkish women's basketball players
Fenerbahçe women's basketball players
Beşiktaş women's basketball players
Isenberg School of Management alumni
Migrosspor basketball players
Mersin Büyükşehir Belediyesi women's basketball players
Forwards (basketball)
Basketball players from Istanbul
Mediterranean Games gold medalists for Turkey
Competitors at the 2005 Mediterranean Games
Mediterranean Games medalists in basketball
Suffolk University faculty